The Escola de Pós-Graduação em Economia (EPGE, Graduate School of Economics) is a Brazilian private higher education institution, founded in 1960 and linked to the Fundação Getúlio Vargas, located in Rio de Janeiro-RJ, Brazil. It was established with the name Centro de Aperfeiçoamento de Economistas (Economist Improvement Center – CAE), where Bachelors of Economics prepared to take master's and doctoral programs abroad. In January, 1966, CAE became known as EPGE, with the introduction of its master's graduate program. Eight years later, in 1974, the Doctoral program was created.

EPGE has been given the highest grade assigned by the Ministry of Education's Higher Learning Personnel Development Coordination (CAPES) to graduate Economics programs in Brazil.

The Graduate School of Economics of Getulio Vargas Foundation 

The mission of the Getulio Vargas Foundation Graduate School of Economics (FGV/EPGE) is enlarging human knowledge and contributing to solving the world's - Brazil's in particular - economic and socioeconomic problems. The School pursues such objectives by trying to offer the highest possible level of education backed by state-of-the-art faculty research.

Since its inception, in 1961, the FGV/EPGE has taught the elite of Brazilian economists. Through its faculty and alumni, it has  added to the conduction of macro and microeconomic policies aimed at fighting poverty, taming inflation and enhancing economic development. Faculty publications in top professional journals, mostly after the mid-1990s, have been frequent and always increasing. Faculty members are devoted to full-time research and invited to teach and present the results of their scientific investigations in the best departments of business and economics around the world.

The School confers Undergraduate, Master and Doctoral degrees in Economics. It also publishes the Revista Brasileira de Economia, the oldest and most prestigious academic economic periodic in Brazil.

After 50 years dedicated to its main objectives, as described above, it is fair to say that EPGE has so far fulfilled its predicted mission. FGV/EPGE has graduated several high-office public officials, including Ministers of State; Governors of States; Presidents and Directors of the Brazilian Central Bank, as well as directors and CEOs of the most dominant and prestigious private enterprises in Brazil and abroad.

Academically, the Tilburg International Ranking of Departments of Economics ranks FGV/EPGE since 2011 as the best school of Economics in Latin America. Moreover, 2011 reports from the Brazilian Ministry of Education have elected both the undergraduate and the post-graduate programs of FGV/EPGE as the best ones offered in Brazil.

Stricto Sensu Graduate Programs 

The school offers three strict graduate programs: doctor of Economics, master of Economics and master of Finance and Business Economics. The two former are strictly academic, and the latter is professional.

The master of Economics program aims students interested in applied education in Economics. The course is intended for students who plan to dedicate to academia, as well as for private and public sector professionals. A doctorate is an extension of the master's program, with new topics incorporated and higher demand levels.

The Master of Finance and Business Economics program was launched in 2002. Its target audience lies in private and public sector managers. MFEE can be taken in parallel with the performance of professional tasks.

Undergraduate and Lato Sensu Graduate Programs 

EPGE launched its undergraduate Economics program since 2002, through the Brazilian School of Economics and Finance. This program teaches some basic knowledge of Human and Social Sciences.

In addition to these courses, EPGE also takes part in broad graduate programs in cooperation with the FGV Educational Development Institute. Also known as specialization courses, these programs is intended so develop skills in the areas of Administration, Marketing, Management and Logistics, Finance, Quality, Law, and Sales.

External links 
 

Fundação Getulio Vargas
Educational institutions established in 1960
1960 establishments in Brazil